Tatiana Ryabkina (née Pereliaeva; born 13 May 1980) is a Russian orienteering competitor. She won the O-Ringen in 2012 and had international success.

World championships
She received a silver medal in the middle distance at the 2004 World Orienteering Championships in Västerås, and a bronze medal in 2006. Her last medal came in the Mixed Sprint relay at the 2015 World Orienteering Championships in Inverness, where she came second to the team from Denmark .

European championships
She received two bronze medals at the 2004 European Orienteering Championships in Roskilde, and a silver medal in the long distance in Ventspils in 2008. She was member of the Russian relay team that received a silver medal in 2008, together with Natalia Korzhova and Yulia Novikova. She won her only Gold medal in senior international competition at the 2012 European Orienteering Championships in Falun, where she ran with Svetlana Mironova and Natalia Efimova.

Junior career
Tatiana won four gold medals at Junior World Orienteering Championships.

References

External links

1980 births
Living people
Russian orienteers
Female orienteers
Foot orienteers
World Orienteering Championships medalists
Competitors at the 2005 World Games
Junior World Orienteering Championships medalists